John Gardiner (c. 1525 – 1586) was an English politician.

He was a Member (MP) of the Parliament of England for Penryn in 1558 and for Dorchester in 1563. He spent time in the Fleet after a property dispute. His brother, William Gardiner, was an MP for Barnstaple.

References

1525 births
1586 deaths
Inmates of Fleet Prison
English MPs 1558
Members of the Parliament of England for Dorchester
English MPs 1563–1567